Eat Your Paisley! is the second studio album by The Dead Milkmen, released on Restless Records in 1986.

"The Thing That Only Eats Hippies" and "Beach Party Vietnam" were included on the 1997 compilation Death Rides a Pale Cow: The Ultimate Collection; "Hippies" appeared on the 1998 compilation Cream of the Crop.

Production
The album was produced by John Wicks, Dave Reckner, and the band. A video was shot for the single, "The Thing That Only Eats Hippies"; it was the band's first video.

In "The Thing That Only Eats Hippies", the band chides "Bob and Greg and Grant, you should beware," a reference to Hüsker Dü's Bob Mould, Greg Norton, and Grant Hart.

Critical reception
Trouser Press wrote that "the group’s wacky observations of stereotypes and artifacts are vague but astute; the music is expendable but never less than presentable." The Globe and Mail wrote that the band "play okay" but "sing execrably." People wrote that the band "produces rough, ragged rock ‘n’ roll with lyrics that express disdain for anything the adult world holds sacred and with music that purposefully negates the slickly produced synthesizer sounds of pretty boys such as Duran Duran and Howard Jones." 

The Ottawa Citizen called the album "an intentionally tasteless, and occasionally funny, attack on the love generation of the '60s." The Philadelphia Inquirer called "the funny songs" funnier than the ones on the debut, and wrote that "the semi-serious songs evince a delirious surrealism that makes them truly powerful rock-and-roll." The Toronto Star deemed Eat Your Paisley! "nearly brilliant." The Chicago Tribune called it "more punky, brash, snotty and frequently funny rock."

Track listing
All tracks by Dead Milkmen

"Where the Tarantula Lives" – 2:38
"Air Crash Museum" – 1:38 
"KKSuck2" – 1:48 
"Fifty Things" – 1:45
"Happy Is" – 2:27
"Beach Party Vietnam" – 1:45
"I Hear Your Name" – 2:31
"Two Feet Off the Ground" – 4:30 
"The Thing that Only Eats Hippies" – 2:43
"Six Days" – 1:45
"Swampland of Desire" – 2:00
"Take Me Apart" – 2:07
"Earwig" – 2:48
"Moron" – 1:53
"The Fez" – 5:12 
"Vince Lombardi Service Center" (CD bonus track) – 2:41

Personnel 

Rodney Anonymous Melloncamp - vocals
Dave Blood – bass
Dean Clean – drums
Dave Reckner – producer
Joe Jack Talcum – guitar, vocals
John Wicks – producer
Brooke Heiser – cover art

References 

The Dead Milkmen albums
1986 albums
Restless Records albums